Alberta Darling (born April 28, 1944) is an American politician and former member of the Wisconsin State Senate.  She represented Wisconsin's 8th State Senate district from 1993 through 2022 as a Republican.  Her constituency included many of the municipalities directly north and northwest of Milwaukee and part of the city of Milwaukee.  She also served three years in the Wisconsin State Assembly.  Before entering public office, she was a teacher and marketing director.

Personal life and education
Darling was born in Hammond, Indiana, and raised in Peoria, Illinois, where she graduated from Richwoods High School. She attended the University of Wisconsin–Madison, receiving a Bachelor of Science degree in secondary education in 1966. After graduating from UW-Madison, she moved to Milwaukee and did graduate work at the University of Wisconsin–Milwaukee from 1972 to 1974.

Prior to her election to the legislature, Darling taught high school English and was later the marketing and business development director for the Milwaukee Art Museum.

Darling met her husband, William "Bill" Darling, during their time at UW-Madison. The two married in 1967, and up until his death in the spring of 2015, Bill was an ear, nose and throat surgeon in southeast Wisconsin. Darling and her husband had two children and three grandchildren. She is a longtime resident of River Hills, Wisconsin, which she represented in the Senate.

Wisconsin State Legislature
Darling first joined the Wisconsin State Legislature by winning a special election in 1990 for the 10th district, defeating Rick Graber in the primary. She served the remainder of the term and a full two-year term in the State Assembly before being elected in 1992 to the State Senate, a seat she has held ever since. Darling faced a contentious election in 2008, though she fended off a challenge from State Representative Sheldon Wasserman by a mere percentage point and would go unopposed in the next two regular election cycles in 2012 and 2016. In 2020, Darling faced a challenge from Neal Plotkin, a sales representative and substitute teacher from Glendale. The race was heavily targeted by Democrats amidst eroding support for Republicans in suburban districts, and Darling was outspent as Plotkin was boosted by a significant edge in outside spending. However, Darling won re-election by eight percentage points (a margin nearly identical to the 2011 recall) as she garnered split-ticket support among Joe Biden voters to secure a comfortable win despite a razor-thin 167-vote margin in the presidential election in her district. Throughout her tenure in the Legislature, Darling has earned a reputation as a fiscal conservative with moderate views on some issues. She endorsed Ted Cruz over Donald Trump in the 2016 Republican presidential primary.

From 2000 to 2021, she served on the influential Joint Finance Committee (responsible for the state budget) and notably served as the longtime Senate co-chair. Her six sessions chairing the committee is tied for most in state history. During the 2021–2023 legislative session, Darling chaired the Committee on Education, served as the Vice-Chair of the Committee on Elections, Election Process Reform and Ethics and also served on the Committee on Judiciary and Public Safety, the Committee on Universities and Technical Colleges, the Joint Survey Committee on Retirement Systems, and the Joint Legislative Council. She is also a member of the Wisconsin State Fair Park Board and the Wisconsin Center District.

2011 recall 
Darling was one of nine Senators (six Republicans and three Democrats) to face a recall election effort in 2011 following the enactment of 2011 Wisconsin Act 10. On March 2, 2011, the "Committee to Recall Darling" officially registered with the Wisconsin Government Accountability Board and on April 20, 2011, the recall campaigns announced that they had gathered nearly 30,000 signaturesenough to trigger a recall election. The 8th Senate District was considered a heavy target for Democrats and outside spending, yet Darling would defeat Democratic challenger Sandy Pasch by a larger margin than she had won in 2008; 54 percent to 46 percent. The election was notably the last race to be called with the balance of the Senate and the ultimate fate of Republican reforms at stake, and received national coverage on election night as a result.

Electoral history

Wisconsin Assembly (1990)

Wisconsin Senate (1992–2020)

References

External links
Senator Alberta Darling (Archived) at the Wisconsin State Legislature
 Biography at Ballotpedia 
 
8th Senate District, Senator Darling in the Wisconsin Blue Book (2005–2006)
10th Assembly District, Representative Darling in the Wisconsin Blue Book (1991–1992)

|-

Republican Party Wisconsin state senators
Republican Party members of the Wisconsin State Assembly
1944 births
Living people
People from Hammond, Indiana
University of Wisconsin–Milwaukee alumni
Women state legislators in Wisconsin
People from Milwaukee County, Wisconsin
21st-century American politicians
21st-century American women politicians